Balme may refer to:

Places
 Balme, comune in the Province of Turin in the Italian region Piedmont
 Cheignieu-la-Balme, commune in the Ain department in the French region Rhône-Alpes
 Col de Balme, a high mountain pass of the Alps on the border between Switzerland and France
 Couches de Balme, a geologic formation in France
 La Balme, commune in the Savoie department in the French region Rhône-Alpes
 La Balme-d'Épy, commune in the Jura department in the French region Franche-Comté
 La Balme-de-Sillingy, commune in the Haute-Savoie department in the French region Rhône-Alpes
 La Balme-de-Thuy, commune in the Haute-Savoie department in the French region Rhône-Alpes
 La Balme-les-Grottes, commune in the Isère department in the French region Rhône-Alpes
 Saint-Salvy-de-la-Balme, commune in the Tarn department in the French region Midi-Pyrénées
 Tête de Balme, mountain in the Mont Blanc Massif

People with the surname
 Augustin de La Balme, French cavalry officer
 David Mowbray Balme (1912-1989), British-born educator in Ghana
 Eugène Balme (1874–1914), French participant in 1910 and 1914 Summer Olympics (shooter)
 Gerry Balme (1885- 1960), Australian football player, WWI medal recipient
 Harold Balme (1878-1953), British medical missionary to China
 Henry Balme (1367-1439), Geneva-born Franciscan theologian
 John Balme (fl. 1970-present), US musician and opera manager
 Neil Balme (b. 1952), Australian football player
 Tim Balme (b. 1967), New Zealand actor and screenwriter

Other
 The Balme Library, the main library on the main campus of the University of Ghana